FC Lahti is a Finnish football club based in the city of Lahti. It currently plays in the Finnish Premier League (Veikkausliiga) after placing first in the Finnish First Division (Ykkönen) during season 2011. The homeground of FC Lahti is Lahden Stadion. FC Lahti is famous of being the local team of the most successful Finnish player, Jari Litmanen, who played for the club in two stints in 2004 and 2009–10. In his youth years and the start of his career, he played in Reipas Lahti.

History
FC Lahti was founded in 1996 when two rival clubs from Lahti – FC Kuusysi and Reipas Lahti (founded in Viipuri and moved to Lahti after Viipuri was ceded to USSR in 1947) – decided to merge. Also, the reserve club FC Pallo-Lahti was formed, but it was closed down after a couple of seasons due to economic difficulties. Both Reipas and Kuusysi controlled the junior section of the club.

FC Lahti played its first season in 1997, in the southern group of Ykkönen, the second tier of Finnish football. It finished second in the first half of the split league format Ykkönen but was placed third in the final half, behind FC Haka and PK-35, both of which were promoted to Veikkausliiga. The next season, 1998, saw success and FC Lahti finally gained promotion to the highest tier. They were relegated at the end of the 2010 season but bounced back after just one season in Ykkönen.

In the premier division, Lahti has not yet achieved the success of Kuusysi and Reipas. In 2007 Lahti won the Finnish League Cup. In 2008 FC Lahti was third in the Veikkausliiga final table and was placed in the UEFA Europa League qualification rounds for season 2009. FC Lahti repeated the success in 2014 by finishing third for the second time in their history. The club qualified to the Europa League qualifiers for the third time in 2018 when the club finished fourth in the table the season before.

Honours
Finnish League Cup
Winners: 2007, 2013, 2016
Runners-up: 2004, 2005
Finnish Cup
Runners-up: 2002

Crest and colours

Kit manufacturers and shirt sponsors

FC Lahti in Europe
As of 20 July 2018

Notes
 1Q: First qualifying round
 2Q: Second qualifying round
 3Q: Third qualifying round

Season to season

Players

Current squad

Management
As of 26 June 2022.

FC Lahti Akatemia

FC Lahti's reserve team played its last season in Kakkonen in 2017. After they were relegated to Kolmonen for the season 2018 the team's activity was taken over by its administrational parent club FC Kuusysi.

Managers 

  Esa Pekonen (1 January 1998 – 31 December 1999)
  Jari Pyykölä (27 August 1999 – 31 December 2001)
  Harri Kampman (1 January 2002 – 31 December 2005)
  Antti Muurinen (1 January 2006 – 10 October 2007)
  Luciano (10 October 2007 – 31 December 2007)
  Ilkka Mäkelä (1 January 2008 – 31 December 2010)
  Tommi Kautonen (1 January 2011 – 4 June 2013)
  Juha Malinen (5 June 2013 – 31 December 2013)
  Toni Korkeakunnas (1 January 2014 – 30 September 2018)
  Sami Ristilä (1 October 2018 – 31 December 2019)
  Ilir Zeneli (1 January 2020 – 23 June 2022)
  Mikko Mannila (26 June 2022 – present)

References

External links
 Official website

 
Lahti
Lahti
Sport in Lahti
1996 establishments in Finland